Héctor Velázquez may refer to:

 Héctor Velázquez (baseball) (born 1988), Mexican professional baseball player
 Héctor Velázquez (boxer) (born 1975), Mexican former professional boxer
 Héctor Velázquez (footballer) (born 1989), Mexican former professional footballer
 Héctor Velázquez Moreno (1922–2006), Mexican architect

See also
 Héctor Velásquez (1952–2010), Chilean Olympic boxer